Valentino Stepčić (born 16 January 1990) is a Croatian footballer who plays for Rudar Labin as a midfielder.

Club career
Born in Pula, but living in Labin, Stepčić spent most of his youth years at the local NK Rudar Labin. Signing for the nearby Prva HNL team HNK Rijeka, he made his first-team debut in a 3–0 away loss against NK Inter Zaprešić on 31 May 2009, coming in the 70th minute for Matija Matko. After leaving Rijeka in 2012, he spent the 2012–13 season in lower-tier teams, first back at Rudar, then at NK Bela Krajina, before signing for NK Zagreb, then in Druga HNL, achieving promotion to Prva HNL immediately at the end of the 2013–14 season. He joined German side Stuttgarter Kickers in 2018 .

References

External links
 
 
 HR Sport profile

1990 births
Living people
Sportspeople from Pula
People from Labin
Association football midfielders
Croatian footballers
HNK Rijeka players
NK Rudar Labin players
NK Bela Krajina players
NK Zagreb players
NK Istra 1961 players
HNK Cibalia players
Anagennisi Deryneia FC players
Stuttgarter Kickers players
Croatian Football League players
First Football League (Croatia) players
Slovenian Second League players
Cypriot Second Division players
Oberliga (football) players
Croatian expatriate footballers
Expatriate footballers in Slovenia
Croatian expatriate sportspeople in Slovenia
Expatriate footballers in Cyprus
Croatian expatriate sportspeople in Cyprus
Expatriate footballers in Germany
Croatian expatriate sportspeople in Germany